Straussler, Straeußler, Strässler, Sträßler, Strauss, Straessler, Stroessner, Strasser, Strassler, and the like may refer to:

People 
 Ernst Sträussler (1872 - 1959), Austrian neuropathologist
 Nicholas Straussler (1891 - 1966), Hungarian-born British engineer
 Tomáš Straussler (born 1937), the original name of the playwright, Sir Tom Stoppard
 Johann Strauss II (1825 - 1899), Austrian composer and son of Johann Strauss. 
 Johann Strauss  (1804 - 1849), Austrian composer and father of Johann Strauss II.
 René Strässler (1943), Swiss photographer.
 Adriana Sanchez-Strässler (1988), Venezuelan-born Argentine architect. 
 Carmen Strässler (1963), Venezuelan-born American Psychopedagogist.
Gregor Strasser (1892 - 1934), Early prominent Nazi German Politician and Officer. Ideological leader of Strasserism along with his brother Otto Strasser.
Otto Strasser (1897 - 1974), German politician and early Nazi party member. Ideological leader of Strasserism along with his brother Gregor Strasser.

Fictional characters
Maria Straussler, the female lead in the second segment of The Adventures of Young Indiana Jones film Masks of Evil.

Other 
 Gerstmann-Sträussler-Scheinker syndrome, a condition named after Ernst Sträussler and others
 Strässler surname, meaning “On the street” or “In der strasse” (Originating in Hüntwangen, Switzerland)
 Strasbourg (UK: /ˈstræzbɜːrɡ/, US: /ˈstræs-, ˈstr ɑːsbʊərɡ, ˈstrɑːzbʊərɡ, -bɜːrɡ, .... That name is of Germanic origin and means "Town (at the crossing) of roads".

German-language surnames
Swiss-German surnames